George de la Poer Beresford was Provost of Tuam from 1816 until his death at Bundoran in September 1842: the revenue was then suspended by the Lord Lieutenant of Ireland and the Privy Council of Ireland.

Notes

1842 deaths
Provosts of Tuam